Glenea glaucescens is a species of beetle in the family Cerambycidae. It was described by Per Olof Christopher Aurivillius in 1903 and is known from Sulawesi.

Varieties
 Glenea glaucescens var. flavicans Breuning, 1958
 Glenea glaucescens var. flavithorax Breuning, 1958
 Glenea glaucescens var. glaucans Breuning, 1958
 Glenea glaucescens var. olivescens Breuning, 1958
 Glenea glaucescens var. partealbescens Breuning, 1958
 Glenea glaucescens var. stramentosus Breuning, 1958

References

glaucescens
Beetles described in 1903